Nandgaon is a historical town and a nagar panchayat in Mathura district in the Indian state of Uttar Pradesh. Nandgaon is a religious centre in Braj region. It is believed that Krishna in his childhood resided in Nandgaon with his family. Nandgaon was named after Nand Baba, father of Krishna.

Geography
Within Nandgaon lies the ancient water body Paawan Sarovar. The ancient site has been restored by the Braj Foundation.

Culture
According to Hindu texts, Nandgaon was the home of Lord Krishna where he resided for nine years and 50 days along with his foster father Nanda Baba and mother Yashoda as Shandilya Muni cursed the demons of Kansa that if they will enter Nandisvara Hill (Nandgaon) they will changed into stone. Nanda Baba, the village chieftain, built the house atop a large hill to protect Lord Krishna from demons sent by King Kansa. Nanda Maharaja and other  decided to move here from Gokula because of the turbulence caused by demons that were trying to kill Krishna.

The hill on which the main temple is located is called the Nandisvara Hill. Lord Shiva had prayed to Krishna to be allowed to witness his transcendental pastimes. After Lord Shiva performed penances for many centuries, Lord Krishna asked him his wish. Lord Shiva told him that he wished to be a mountain at Nandgaon, so that the Gopis would step on him, leaving the dust of their feet on him. Krishna granted him this boon and Lord Shiva became the Nandisvara Hill, on which Nandgaon is situated. Nandgaon is a major religious and tourist destination owing to its association with Lord Krishna. Every year thousands flock to the town during Holi to witness the wonderful festival of Lathmar holi.

Demographics
As of the 2001 Census of India, Nandgaon had a population of 9956. Males constitute 54% of the population and females 46%. Nandgaon has an average literacy rate of 45%, lower than the national average of 59.5%: male literacy is 59%, and female literacy is 29%. In Nandgaon, 19% of the population is under 6 years of age.

How to reach
Nandgaon is 48 km (29 mi) northwest of Vrindavana.  The easiest way to get there is to take a taxi, which takes about an hour. To get there by public transportation from Vrindavana take a public bus to the town of Kosi (40 km/24 mi).  From there take a tempo to Nandgaon, which is 10 km away. The Braja Darsana bus comes here after stopping in Barsana. The bus departs at 8 a.m. from the Vrindavana bus stand and also stops near the front of the ISKCON Temple.

References

External links
Shri Yashoda Nand Ji Mandir

Cities and towns in Mathura district